Mburucuyá is the Guaraní name for certain passion flowers, such as Passiflora caerulea and Passiflora edulis. It is the origin of the term "maracujá", and namesake for several localities in South America:
Mburucuyá, Corrientes
Mburucuyá National Park
Mburucuyá Department